The 2017 Junior Men's French Pacific Handball Championship was held in Bluesky Sports Arena, Rarotonga, Cook Islands on 3 August, 2017 during the 2017 Oceania Men's Handball Challenge Trophy.

The competition participants Tahiti, and New Caledonia. Wallis and Futuna did not send a team.

The winners were Tahiti over New Caledonia.

Results

Rankings

References

 New Caledonia and Tahiti start IHF Trophy strong. International Handball Federation webpage. 4 August, 2017
 La Calédonie perd de 15 buts contre Tahiti. Les Nouvelles Caledoniennes (french). 5 August. 2017

French Pacific Junior Men's Handball Cup
Pacific Handball Cup